Tenente Portela is a city in the north-west region of Rio Grande do Sul, the southernmost state of Brazil, with an estimated population of 13,434 inhabitants. Area: 337.5 km².

References

External links 
 Tenente Portela
 Terra Indígena Guarita

Municipalities in Rio Grande do Sul